Sumie or Sumi-e or Sumi e or variation, may also refer to:

People
Sumie is a feminine Japanese given name. Notable people with the name include:

, Japanese long jumper
Sumie Baba (born 1967), a Japanese voice actor
 Sumie Ishitaka, women's professional shogi player
Sumie Oinuma (born 1946), a Japanese volleyball player and Olympic medalist
Sumie Sakai (born 1971), a Japanese professional wrestler and mixed martial artist
Sumie Sakai (born 1945), a Japanese actress and voice actress

Fictional characters
, a character from Kamen Rider Fourze

Music
"SUMIE" (song), a tune by Toshiko Akiyoshi off the 1976 album Insights (album)
Sumie (Toshiko Akiyoshi Quartet album), a 1971 jazz quartet album by pianist Toshiko Akiyoshi
 "Sumie" (song), a tune off the eponymous album Sumie (Toshiko Akiyoshi Quartet album)
Sumi-e (Toshiko Akiyoshi – Lew Tabackin Big Band), a 1979 jazz album by the Toshiko Akiyoshi - Lew Tabackin Big Band
 "Sumi-e" (song), a tune off the eponymous album Sumi-e (Toshiko Akiyoshi – Lew Tabackin Big Band)

Other uses
Sumie, an East Asian type of ink and wash painting
SUMIE, a navigational beacon for Port Columbus International Airport involved in the crash of United Express Flight 6291

See also

 
 
 Sumii
 Sume (disambiguation)
 Sumi (disambiguation)
 Sumy (disambiguation)

Japanese feminine given names